Joachim Otto August Achatius von Kortzfleisch (3 January 1890 – 20 April 1945) was a German general in the Wehrmacht during World War II. As the commander of the Military District III (Berlin), he played a role in the failure of the attempted coup following the 20 July Plot attempt to assassinate Adolf Hitler, which was led by Kortzfleisch's own distant cousin, Claus von Stauffenberg.

Biography
Von Kortzfleisch was born into an aristocratic Westphalian family in Braunschweig, Duchy of Brunswick, the son of the Prussian Major General Gustav von Kortzfleisch (1854–1910) and Elsbeth ( Oppermann; 1862-1937). He joined the army in 1907 and after service in World War I in a machine gun battalion he was an officer in the Reichswehr, reaching the rank of Generalmajor by 1937. He was a Generalleutnant and commander of the 1st Infantry Division at the outbreak of World War II and was awarded the Knight's Cross of the Iron Cross on 1 September 1940 as commander of the XI Army Corps of the Wehrmacht.

On 20  July 1944 as the commander of the Military District III (Berlin) he was summoned to the Bendlerstrasse by General Friedrich Fromm. When he arrived, he was perplexed to see that Fromm was no longer in command, that Ludwig Beck was now in control. He angrily refused to obey Operation Valkyrie orders issued by one of the leading conspirators General Friedrich Olbricht and kept shouting ‘the Führer is not dead’ and referring to the oath of loyalty to Hitler. He was arrested and put under guard by the plotters and said that he was not willing to take part in a coup as he was just a soldier interested only in going home and pulling weeds in his garden. 

He was replaced in his command by General Karl Freiherr von Thüngen and was later allowed to leave the Bendlerblock. He subsequently interrogated Major Hans-Ulrich von Oertzen, a supporter of the plot. Kortzfleisch was later shocked to learn that the officer leading the plot was his own distant cousin Claus von Stauffenberg, with whom he had attended a wedding the previous year.

In March 1945 he was the commander of the Rhine Bridgehead in Army Group B under Field Marshal Walter Model. He was shot dead by soldiers of the 737th Tank Battalion of the United States Army on 20 April 1945. Kortzfleisch and a handful of soldiers had tried to get to Berleburg, moving behind the enemy lines. A US patrol encountered them at Schmallenberg-Wulwesort, Sauerland. The general defended himself with a machine pistol as he was surrounded by US soldiers, and was told to put his hands up. After he refused to do this, he was instantly shot by a US soldier.

Awards and decorations

 Knight's Cross of the Iron Cross on 4 September 1940 as General der Infanterie and commander of XI. Armeekorps

References

Citations

Bibliography

 
 

1890 births
1945 deaths
Military personnel from Braunschweig
German Army generals of World War II
German Army personnel of World War I
Generals of Infantry (Wehrmacht)
Recipients of the clasp to the Iron Cross, 1st class
Recipients of the Knight's Cross of the Iron Cross
Westphalian nobility
German Army personnel killed in World War II
Deaths by firearm in Germany
Reichswehr generals